The Moon in the Gutter is a 1983 French drama film directed by Jean-Jacques Beineix. It was entered into the 1983 Cannes Film Festival.

Although it immediately followed  Beineix's big, commercial success Diva and featured two very big stars, Gérard Depardieu and Nastassja Kinski, The Moon in the Gutter was not well received by critics or audiences and failed at the box office with only 625,000 admissions in France. Its vivid visual style was noted by critics.  It preceded a much better-appreciated cult success from the same director, known in the U.S. and UK as Betty Blue.

The film was based on a 1953 pulp-noir novel of the same name, written by David Goodis, but it was transferred in the film script from the docksides of Philadelphia to Marseille.

La Lune dans le caniveau, according to AllMovie, "received uneven reviews on its initial release". It won a French Cesar Award for its production design.

Synopsis
Two women: Loretta (Nastassja Kinski), a wealthy amateur photographer who prowls the docks in her '60s Ferrari 250 GT California Spyder looking for handsome men, and Bella (Victoria Abril), a poor but beautiful woman who is probably a prostitute, share affections for a dock worker named Gerard (played by Gérard Depardieu).  He is obsessed by the memory of his sister, who was raped and then committed suicide in a back alley, which he visits every night.  No one knows who committed the rape, and he has sworn to avenge the crime, if he can only figure out who the perpetrator was.

Reception
Although the movie was a failure when first released, it had a number of cult admirers.  In the mid-1980s it was often screened as a fashionable late night art movie for esoteric clubs such as the Edinburgh Academy Cinema Society.

In the American DVD release director Jean-Jacques Beineix reveals that after the expanded 3 hour DVD version director's cut of Betty Blue was released he approached Gaumont, the studio that produced the film, about doing the same with The Moon in the Gutter.  A studio executive later notified him sadly that such an extended release recut was not possible in this case.  It was revealed that Gaumont had felt the film was so poorly received initially that all of the extra footage and doubles were destroyed to make space in the film vaults.

The excuse was that accountants had reasoned that the film was a financial liability with little future value that had severely damaged Gaumont's reputation.  Such an action is said to be extremely rare in the film industry since the cost of storing film footage is rather minimal after production has ended.  Beineix added that the film had originally been cut into a 4 hour version and a 3 hour version as well and that both lost versions expanded on the main characters and more fully exposed and explained the story's main premise. The loss reportedly haunted Beineix to his death.

Cast
 Gérard Depardieu : Gérard Delmas
 Nastassja Kinski : Loretta Channing
 Victoria Abril : Bella
 Bertice Reading : Lola
 Gabriel Monnet : Tom
 Dominique Pinon : Frank
 Milena Vukotic : Frieda
 Vittorio Mezzogiorno : Newton Channing
 Bernard Farcy : Jésus
 Anne-Marie Coffinet : Dora
 Katya Berger - Catherine
 Jacques Herlin
 Guido Alberti

References

External links
 
 

1983 films
1983 drama films
1980s French-language films
Films directed by Jean-Jacques Beineix
Films scored by Gabriel Yared
Films set in Marseille
Films based on American novels
French drama films
1980s French films